Allan Robert Phillips (October 25, 1914 – January 26, 1996) was an American ornithologist. He mainly studied birds in the southwestern United States and Mexico. His most notable work is The Birds of Arizona, co-authored with Joe Marshall and Gale Monson.

Work

Phillips, over the span of his almost 65-year career, published a total of 172 articles and other various written material. Except for one on a mammal, all of his works were on birds. Most of these articles were on the distribution, status, and taxonomy of the birds he studied.

References 

American ornithologists
Cornell University alumni
Deaths from cancer
1914 births
1996 deaths
20th-century American zoologists